Sewellia lineolata, the reticulated hillstream loach, is a species of fish from the provinces of Thua Thien-Hue, Quang Nam, Quang Ngai and Binh Dinh in Vietnam.

Habitat 
Sewellia lineotola is found in shallow, fast-flowing, highly oxygenated tributaries and headwaters that contain stretches of riffles broken up by pools or sometimes waterfalls. Inhabited substrates are normally composed of gravel, bedrock and sand among stretches containing boulders, surrounded by well-developed riparian vegetations but with fewer aquatic plants present. The most favorable habitats have oxygen-saturated clear water which, combined with the sun, creates a rich biofilm covering submerged surfaces. During times of high rainfall, some streams can become murky as a result of suspended material caused by larger flow rate and water depth.

Diet 
Sewellia lineolata eat benthic algae and associated micro-organisms. Insect larvae may be eaten opportunistically. In the aquarium, fish flakes, mini pellets, and algae wafers can also be added to the diet, along with bloodworms, brine shrimp, daphnia, and tubifex.

References

External links 

Vulnerable species
Fish described in 1846
Fish of Vietnam
Taxa named by Achille Valenciennes
Gastromyzontidae